The Federal University of Bahia (UFBA) is a public university located mainly in the city of Salvador. It is the largest university in the state of Bahia and one of Brazil's most prestigious educational institutions.

Students can study there without paying tuition fees, as it is a public university. To join the university they must pass an annual examination, known as the "ENEM" (National High School Exam).

History
UFBA was created on April 8, 1946, through Decree-Law 9155. Earlier, the Federal University of Bahia was formed by the School of Medicine and their associated schools, Dentistry and Pharmacy, and the schools of Philosophy, Economics, Law beyond the Polytechnic School. The actual installation of the university took place on July 2, 1946, the oldest center of higher education in the country, the School of Medicine at the Shrine of Jesus.

Four years later, the Federal University of Bahia was federalized. On December 4, 1950, the government enacted the 2234 law setting the Federal System of Higher Education. Since then, the university has been called the Federal University of Bahia. The history of higher education in the state dates back to 1808 when, for determination of the Portuguese court, the first school of medical education in the country was established: the Medical School of Bahia. This was followed by the Faculty of Pharmacy (1832), School of Fine Arts (1877), School of Law (1891), Polytechnique School (1897), School of Economics (1905), School of Philosophy, Sciences and Letters (1943), School of Librarianship (1942) that formed part of others since 1946.

Student life
The university has 57 undergraduate courses, 82 post-graduate courses and more than 100 postgraduate courses. UFBA is one of the first universities in Brazil, having locations throughout the capital of Bahia and one inside, in Vitória da Conquista (south-west).

In 2008, there were three campuses. The candidates per vacancy average was 6.2. The UFBA's Cooperation Agreements has 32 countries (such as the United States, Sweden, Argentina, South Africa, New Zealand, and others).

Notable alumni
Gilberto Gil, musician
Milton Santos, geographer 
Wagner Moura, actor
Ananda Nahu, artist
Caetano Veloso, musician
Raul Seixas, musician
Carlos Marighella, politician
Jean Wyllys, politician 
Norberto Odebrecht, engineer 
Jaqueline Goés de Jesus, scientist
Eliana Calmon, first woman member of Brazil's Superior Court of Justice (STJ)

See also 
 Brazil university rankings
 Universities and higher education in Brazil

References

External links 

 
 UFBA Events APP

Educational institutions established in 1946
Universities and colleges in Salvador, Bahia
1946 establishments in Brazil
Bahia